The women's singles table tennis event at the 2011 Summer Universiade took place from August 15 to August 20 at the Shenzhen Bay Sports Center Gym in Shenzhen, China. The preliminary round will be staged in pools, and the top players from each pool will move to the elimination rounds.

Medalists

Preliminary round

Group 1

Group 2

Group 3

Group 4

Group 5

Group 6

Group 7

Group 8

Group 9

Group 10

Group 11

Group 12

Group 13

Group 14

Group 15

Group 16

Group 17

Group 18

Group 19

Group 20

Group 21

Group 22

Group 23

Group 24

Elimination Draw

Finals

Top half

Section 1

Section 2

Bottom half

Section 3

Section 4

References
Preliminary Round Draw
Preliminary Round Results
Elimination Main Draw

Table tennis at the 2011 Summer Universiade